Person-to-person and person to person may refer to:

 Person-to-person call;  see Operator assistance
 Peer-to-peer lending, also called P2P or person-to-person lending

Film and television 
 Person to Person, a 1953–61 American television series
 Person to Person (Australian TV series), a 1959–1960 Australian television series
 "Person to Person" (Mad Men), the final episode of the TV series Mad Men
 Person to Person (film), a 2017 film directed by Dustin Guy Defa

Music 
 Person to Person (Mildred Anderson album), 1960
 Person to Person (George Cables album), 1995
 Person to Person!, a 1970 album by Houston Person
 Person to Person: Live at the Blue Note, a 2003 Ben E. King album
 Person to Person, a 2009 album by Foreign Born
 "Person to Person", a song by Screamin' Jay Hawkins

See also 
 P2P (disambiguation)
 Peer-to-peer (disambiguation)
 Peer-to-peer, a distributed computing architecture